Evgenii Mikhailovich Landis (Yevgeny Mikhaylovich Landis; 6 October 1921 – 12 December 1997) was a Soviet mathematician who worked mainly on partial differential equations.

Life
Landis was born in Kharkiv, Ukrainian SSR, Soviet Union.  He was Jewish. He studied and worked at the Moscow State University, where his advisor was Alexander Kronrod, and later Ivan Petrovsky. In 1946, together with Kronrod, he rediscovered Sard's lemma, unknown in USSR at the time.

Later, he worked on uniqueness theorems for elliptic and parabolic differential equations, Harnack inequalities, and Phragmén–Lindelöf type theorems.  With Georgy Adelson-Velsky, he invented the AVL tree data structure (where "AVL" stands for Adelson-Velsky Landis).

He died in Moscow. His students include Yulij Ilyashenko.

External links

Biography of Y.M. Landis at the International Centre for Mathematical Sciences.

20th-century Russian mathematicians
Soviet mathematicians
Soviet inventors
Moscow State University alumni
1921 births
1997 deaths
Mathematical analysts
Ukrainian Jews
Ukrainian mathematicians
Ukrainian inventors